Lucius Crassus may refer to:

 Lucius Licinius Crassus ancient Roman orator
 Lucius Crassus, pen name of Alexander Hamilton (1755-1804) American statesman